Harry Brooks may refer to:

Harry Brooks (composer) (1895–1970), American jazz composer, pianist and songwriter
Harry Brooks (politician) (born 1946), Tennessee state representative
Harry J. Brooks (1903–1928), American test pilot
Harry W. Brooks, Jr., general of the 25th Infantry Division (United States)

See also
Harry Brookes Allen (1854–1926), Australian pathologist
Harry George Brookes (1934–2011), Australian politician
Harold Brooks (disambiguation)
Henry Brooks (disambiguation)
Henry Brooke (disambiguation)